Sir John Rous, 1st Baronet (c. 1608 – 27 November 1670) was an English politician who sat in the House of Commons  from 1660 to 1670.

Rous was the son of Sir John Rous of Henham Hall and his wife Elizabeth Yelverton, daughter of Sir Christopher Yelverton, Lord Chief Justice. 

In 1660, Rous was elected Member of Parliament for Dunwich in the Convention Parliament. He was created baronet of Henham, Suffolk on 17 August 1660. In 1661 he was re-elected MP for Dunwich in the Cavalier Parliament and sat until his death in 1670. 

Rous married firstly Anne Bacon, daughter of Nicholas Bacon of Gillingham. He married secondly Elizabeth Knyvett, daughter of Thomas Knyvett of Ashwell Thorpe, Norfolk and by her had a son John and two daughters. 

He died on 27 Nov 1670 and was buried at Wangford.

References

1600s births
1670 deaths
Baronets in the Baronetage of England
Year of birth uncertain
People from Wangford
English MPs 1660
English MPs 1661–1679